The Coppa Cittá di Enna was a sports car race held at the Autodromo di Pergusa near Enna, Italy.  The race began in 1950 as a non-championship event, before joining the World Sportscar Championship in 1962.  Between 1968 and 1981, the race bounced between the WSC, the European Sportscar Championship, and non-championship status.  The race was revived as part of the Sports Racing World Cup in 1999.

Results

External links
Racing Sports Cars: Pergusa archive
World Sports Racing Prototypes: Non-championship archive, WSC archive, ESCC archive, Italian Group 6 archive

World Sportscar Championship races
Auto races in Italy
Sports car races
Sport in Sicily
Enna